Steve Hixson Toth (born November 29, 1960) is an American businessman and politician serving as a member of the Texas House of Representatives from District 15.

Early life and education

Born and raised in New York, Toth attended Pittsford Mendon High School in suburban Rochester. He also attended Rochester Bible College.

Career 
Toth is also a commentator on the political show FOX Faceoff which appears on Fox 26 Houston.

Texas House of Representatives
Texas House District 15 is based entirely in suburban Montgomery County, centered around The Woodlands. It is part of the Houston Metro area in the southeastern portion of the state.

2012–2014 
Toth won the 2012 election to the State House district 15. In February 2013, newly inaugurated Representative Toth was elected by his colleagues to the House Republican Caucus Policy Committee as the East Texas representative on the panel.

In his first legislative session in 2013, Toth authored and carried the CSCOPE Transparency Act in the House (SB-1406). The bill brought the CSCOPE (Common Core) curriculum under the purview of the Texas State Board of Education.

Gun legislation
He authored the Firearms Protection Act (HB 1076) restricting federal control and regulations of firearms, which made it a Class A misdemeanor to interfere with a Texan's Second Amendment rights. The act also protected Texas' state and local law enforcement officers from violating the U.S. Constitution, and prevented the federal government from targeting certain firearms and accessories with restrictions. Texas Monthly Magazine called this the "nuttiest gun bill ever" and placed Steve on their dishonorable mention list of the worst Legislators in Texas that year.  Toth received assistance from Texas Attorney General Greg Abbott in drafting the bill. On May 6, 2013 HB 1076 received enough votes to pass in The Texas House but was never approved by The Senate so did not become law. Toth supports constitutional carry for Texas.

2019–2021

On January 11, 2019, Toth filed House Bill 792 (Senate Bill 345) with the 86th Legislature and entitled it the Jones Forest Preservation Act ("Jones Forest Act"). The Jones Forest Act protects the 1,722-acre William Goodrich Jones State Forest from development. Texas A&M University suggested that the university would develop a Texas A&M campus on the land, which sits next to The Woodlands, Texas. Neighborhood associations in the area complained that the development would add to traffic congestion and eliminate a forest that has been part of Texas heritage since 1923. It was passed by both the Texas House and the Texas Senate and sent to Governor Greg Abbott on May 25, 2019.

In January 2019, he was appointed to the House Appropriations Committee by Texas House Speaker Dennis Bonnen. On January 25, Toth along with Will Metcalf and Cecil Bell filed House Bill 1042 which would require Texas schools and law enforcement agencies to establish active shooter response plans and law enforcement agencies to conduct annual drills while also requiring law enforcement to immediately contain or eliminate a threat.

On February 7, 2019, Toth filed the JD Lambright Local Government Ethics Reform Act (HB-1495), which requires cities, counties, and other political subdivisions statewide to post contracts they have with taxpayer-funded lobbyists and to post how much they are paying the lobbyists. It was filed in the Senate by Brandon Creighton on February 8 as Senate Bill 710. The house bill was passed by both chambers and was sent to the governor for signature on May 29, 2019. Governor Abbott signed the bill into law on June 14, 2019.

In February 2019, Toth co-authored Texas House Bill 1500 which would ban abortions after the detection of an unborn child's heartbeat. He also co-authored Texas House Bill 896 which would prohibit abortion. In March 2019, Toth became a cosponsor of SB 22 which prohibits government entities from providing taxpayer-funded resources (including cash, goods, services, and anything of value) to Planned Parenthood. It was a response to Planned Parenthood's $1-per-year rental agreement with the City of Austin for a clinic. It passed both chambers and was sent to Abbott on May 25, 2019 for signature. The bill was signed into law by Abbott on June 7, 2019.

On March 5, 2019, Toth introduced Texas HB 3145, the School Lunch Bill. It clarifies that each parent, including the non-custodial parent, in a divorce can visit their child during school lunch and school activities regardless of possession schedule. It passed both chambers and was sent to the governor on May 28, 2019.

In March 2019 Toth introduced Texas House Bill 2518 which aims to reduce cannabis possession from a Class B to a Class C misdemeanor. To take it down from B to C would remove jail time for simple possession (180 days is the current penalty) and lower the monetary penalty from $2,000 down to $500.

In August 2020, Toth, along with fellow state representatives Mike Lang, Kyle Biedermann, Bill Zedler, and state senator Bob Hall sued Texas Governor Greg Abbott over a $295 million Covid-19 contact tracing contract Abbott awarded to a small Frisco, Texas technology firm without approval from the Texas legislature. In May 2020, Toth protested Abbott's lockdown order by getting a haircut.

In November 2020, during the 87th Texas legislative session, Toth filed again the Texas Firearm Protection Act (HB 112), basically the same piece of legislation that he originally filed in January 2019.  The previous version passed the Texas House with a 100-vote supermajority but died in the Senate.  Governor Greg Abbott assisted Toth in writing the bill in 2013 when Abbott was serving as Texas Attorney General.  It is also known as the Second Amendment sanctuary bill. It would make any attempt to enforce federal gun laws in Texas void if those laws were not part of Texas law. The bill had 14 co-sponsors including Briscoe Cain, Valoree Swanson, Cecil Bell, and Tony Tinderholt. It was referred to the State Affairs Committee of the House, from which it never progressed.  However, a similar bill, House Bill 2622 (by Representative Justin Holland and Senator Bob Hall) passed the Texas House (with Toth's support) and the Texas Senate and was signed by Governor Greg Abbott on June 17, 2021.

Toth was ranked the fourth most conservative House member of the 2021 Texas legislature by Mark Jones, a political science professor at Rice University.

On July 19, 2021, Toth introduced a bill to conduct a forensic audit of the November 2020 election in the 13 counties with the largest populations in Texas, which tend to lean for the Democratic Party. The bill has been named the Texas Voter Confidence Act. Asked why he did not call for an audit of all counties in the state, Toth argued it would be time-consuming and expensive, and cited the Republican lean of the counties, "What’s the point? I mean, all the small counties are red." Election experts said that it did not make sense to specifically exclude Republican-leaning counties if the intent was to detect errors. On September 23, 2021, former President Donald Trump endorsed Toth's House bill 16.

2021–present
Toth, during the pre-filing period of the Texas legislature, in November 2022, introduced House Bill 41, which would prohibit healthcare providers from receiving professional liability insurance coverage for performing or prescribing certain “gender transitioning” procedures for children, including genital removal surgeries, chemical castration, puberty blockers, and other sex-change therapies.

Toth supports a ban on Democrats being given committee chairmanships as long as the Republicans hold the majority of seats.

On February 8, 2023, Toth was appointed to the Appropriations and Corrections committees of the 88th Session.  Toth has served on the Appropriations Committee every legislative session since 2019.

Political campaigns

2012 Texas House campaign
In the 2012 Republican primary for the District 15 House seat, the more conservative Toth unseated the five-term incumbent, Rob Eissler, 56.5% to 43.5%. In the general election, Toth defeated the Libertarian Party nominee, Sterling Russell 87% to 13%. No Democrat sought the seat.

2014 Texas Senate campaign 
On October 3, 2013, State Senator Tommy Williams said he would not run again in the State Senate Republican primary election scheduled for March 4, 2014.

In the May 10, 2014, special election to fill the Senate seat that Williams left, Toth came in second place behind Creighton. Creighton received 45.2%, Toth 23.7%, Bunch 21.8%, and Galloway 9.3%.

Toth and Creighton then met in a special election runoff on August 5, 2014. In the special election runoff, Toth was defeated by Creighton 67% to 33% percent. Rice University political science professor Mark Jones said both Creighton and Toth "are significantly more conservative than Williams."

2016 congressional campaign

In November 2015, Toth announced his candidacy for Texas's 8th congressional district seat held at the time by Kevin Brady. In January 2016, Toth received the endorsement of all Tea Party organizations in Montgomery County, Texas. Professor Jones of Rice University stated: "Toth is certainly a more credible challenger than the typical Republican gadfly who is unknown and unfunded."

In the March 1, primary, Toth and two fellow challengers held incumbent Brady to 53 percent of the vote. In 2014, Brady had received 68 percent of the vote in the primary. In 2016, Brady prevailed with 64,745 votes (53.4 percent) to Toth's 45,298 (37.4 percent). Two other candidates held the remaining 9.2 percent of the ballots cast. During the primary, Toth and the two other challengers (Craig McMichael and Andre Dean) had an informal détente among themselves. As all three were politically to the right of Representative Brady, and believing none of them would win an outright majority of votes cast their immediate goal was to force a run-off. Their hope was that then the top vote getter among themselves would face off and defeat Brady for the nomination, but Brady did get over 50% of the vote.

Toth spent $89,325 on the primary. Brady spent over $1.5 million on the primary. Toth criticized Brady for compromising too often with President Obama, supporting the omnibus federal budget bill, and voting to revive the U.S. Export-Import Bank. Toth had support from Tea Party groups. Brady received significant support from the business wing of the Republican Party. FEC filings show leading up to the primary and general elections he received campaign contributions from the following industries: Oil and Gas $401K, Healthcare $367K, Insurance $302K, Securities & Investments $269K, Pharmaceuticals $261K.

2018 Texas House campaign 
On May 31, 2017, Toth announced that he would be running for his old Texas House seat, District 15, since the incumbent, Mark Keough, announced he would not be running for re-election but instead run for Montgomery County Judge. Toth's opponent in the Republican primary was Mary "Jackie" Waters of The Woodlands. Toth stated that he wanted to reduce property taxes for homeowners by implementing an acquisition-based appraisal system. A taxpayer's home value would be set upon the purchase price, regardless of how long the taxpayer lives in the house. Toth wants to encourage the San Jacinto River Authority ("SJRA") to work on the flood control aspects of its mission statement, instead of keeping Lake Conroe at full capacity for recreational purposes. He has also advocated for the directors of the SJRA board to be elected positions and for the directors to have a civil engineering background, to encourage effective floodplain models.

On March 6, 2018, Toth won the Republican nomination for Texas House District 15 over Waters by 78% to 21%. Toth received the largest vote margin of any candidate in Montgomery County, defeating Waters by 58% of the vote, a three to one margin.

In the November 2018 general election, Toth faced Democrat Lorena Perez McGill of The Woodlands. Toth indicated that in the general election against McGill he would be focusing on lowering property taxes, passing tax reform, and raising teacher salaries. From July through September 30, 2018, Toth raised $65,756, spent $7,026 and had $56,896 on hand. For the period from September 28 to October 27, 2018, Toth raised $24,279, spent $30,722, and had $51,629 on hand. On Election Day, Toth defeated McGill 67% to 33%, a two to one margin.

2020 Texas House campaign 
Toth was unopposed in the March 3, 2020 Republican primary. He faced Democrat Lorena Perez McGill again in the 2020 general election in November. He defeated McGill by a two to one margin, 67% to 33% in 2018.

During the election, he was part of a group of Texas Republicans who filed lawsuits in both state and federal courts seeking to invalidate about 127,000 drive-thru cast votes in Harris County, Texas. Toth said that the county exceeded their state constitutional authority by allowing drive-thru voting as an alternative to walk-in voting during the COVID-19 pandemic, a change that Toth argued that should have only been decided by the Texas Legislature. Democrats said that this would disenfranchise everybody who cast drive-thru votes in good faith. The Texas Supreme Court dismissed the motion without issuing an order or opinion. Upon this defeat Toth then took the case to federal court, initially losing at the lower court level. Federal Judge Andrew Hanen ruled that the plaintiffs did not have standing to sue.  After the appeal, nine of the ten drive-thru voting sites were shut down by interim Harris County Clerk Chris Hollins.

On November 3, 2020, Toth again defeated McGill 66.5% to 33.5%, a two-to-one margin.  McGill raised $44,828, but she spent $58,422.

2022 Texas House campaign
Toth faced an opponent in the March 1, 2022, Republican primary. His opponent was attorney Maris Blair, whose law firm primarily collects taxes. Blair has never held office and her father's law firm is the largest tax collection firm in Texas. As of the beginning of early voting, February 14, 2022, Toth had cash on hand of $252,801 and Blair had $26,117. Toth won the Republican primary with 69% of the vote to Blair's 31%, a two-to-one margin of victory. Toth faced schoolteacher Democrat Kristin Johnson in the general election. On November 8, 2022, Toth defeated Johnson 66% to 34%, once again a two-to-one margin.

Personal life
Toth and his wife, Babette Jayne Toth (born 1957), have three children and two grandchildren. They have resided in Montgomery County since 1997.

Election results

2022 general election for Texas 15th district state representative

2022 Republican primary for Texas 15th district state representative

2020 general election for Texas 15th district state representative

2018 general election for Texas 15th district state representative

2018 Republican primary for Texas 15th district state representative

2016 Republican primary for Texas 8th Congressional district

2014 special election runoff for Texas 4th district state senator

2014 special election for Texas 4th district state senator

2012 general election for Texas 15th district state representative

2012 Republican primary for Texas 15th district state representative

References

External links
 

1960 births
Living people
Republican Party members of the Texas House of Representatives
Politicians from Rochester, New York
People from The Woodlands, Texas
American clergy
Businesspeople from Texas
American Christian clergy
Pittsford Mendon High School alumni
21st-century American politicians
Businesspeople from Rochester, New York